The Indonesia national under-20 futsal team for represents Indonesia in international futsal competitions that pertain to under-20 age level and is controlled by the Futsal Commission of the PSSI.

Competition records

AFC U-20 Asian Cup 

 *Denotes draws include knockout matches decided on penalty kicks.

Players

Current squad 
The following players were selected for the 2019 AFC U-20 Futsal Championship.

Caps and goals as of 22 June 2019 after the match against  Iran.

See also
 Indonesia national futsal team
 Indonesia women's national futsal team

References

External links 
 The Official Indonesian Futsal Committee website
 Indonesia U-20 futsal on AFC
 Indonesia U-20 Futsal on Bolalob.com
 Indonesia U-20 Futsal on Bolalob Futsal

Asian national futsal teams
Futsal
Futsal in Indonesia